NGC 70 is a spiral galaxy located in the constellation Andromeda. It was discovered on October 7, 1855 by R. J. Mitchell and was also observed on December 19, 1897 by Guillaume Bigourdan from France who described it as "extremely faint, very small, round, between 2 faint stars"

NGC 70 is a member of a compact group of seven  or eight galaxies, sometimes called the NGC 70 Group or the VV 166 Group.
The group consists of three relatively bright galaxies: 70, 71 and 72 in the NGC catalog, along with four fainter galaxies.  NGC 68 appears to be a group member, but its discrepant radial velocity and lack of tidal distortion suggests that it may be an unrelated galaxy along the group's line of sight. In photographs the NGC 70 group resembles the much more famous Stephan's Quintet group, and it is a popular target for amateur astrophotographers.

References

External links
 

113
0070
01194
00174
Barred spiral galaxies
17840911
Andromeda (constellation)
Discoveries by R. J. Mitchell (astronomer)